Marianne Iren Pettersen (born 12 April 1975 in Oslo) is a Norwegian footballer. She was a forward for the club Asker, whom she joined from Gjelleråsen after the 1996 season, and became the top scorer with 36 goals in the 1998 season of 18 matches.

Career
For the Norwegian national team, Pettersen debuted in 1994, scoring against Italy. 

In the 1995 FIFA Women's World Cup held in Sweden, she scored three times to help the Norwegian team win its first World Cup, including the second goal in Norway's 2-0 win over Germany in the tournament final.

In 1999 when she was 22 she created a record in the Women's Euros when she scored four goals in a single match. The match was against Denmark at Lillestrom and the final score was 5-0.

Overall, she scored 66 goals in 98 international matches. She retired in 2003, after competing in the 1996 and 2000 Summer Olympics.

In 2007, she rejoined Asker as the assistant trainer and began playing again, as a reserve striker.  On 19 May the same year she took the record as the highest scorer in the elite Norwegian league, the Toppserien, with 147 goals to that date.

International goals

Fulham
Pettersen rejected offers from American clubs to join Fulham Ladies, the only professional women's club in Europe, in January 2001. On her debut she scored a hat-trick in an 8–0 destruction of Manchester City in the fourth round of the FA Women's Cup. Later in 2001, Pettersen was then appointed as the new captain. Pettersen was nominated for FIFA World Player of the Year award.

Honours

Olympics
Atlanta 1996 – Bronze
Sydney 2000 – Gold

FIFA Women's World Cup
1995 FIFA World Cup in Sweden – Gold

References

Norwegian women's footballers
1975 births
Living people
Footballers at the 1996 Summer Olympics
Footballers at the 2000 Summer Olympics
Olympic footballers of Norway
Olympic gold medalists for Norway
Olympic bronze medalists for Norway
Fulham L.F.C. players
FA Women's National League players
Asker Fotball (women) players
Athene Moss players
Toppserien players
Olympic medalists in football
Norway women's international footballers
1995 FIFA Women's World Cup players
1999 FIFA Women's World Cup players
2003 FIFA Women's World Cup players
FIFA Women's World Cup-winning players
Norwegian expatriate sportspeople in England
Norwegian expatriate women's footballers
Expatriate women's footballers in England
Medalists at the 2000 Summer Olympics
Medalists at the 1996 Summer Olympics
Women's association football forwards
Footballers from Oslo